Gabriel Dell (born Gabriel Marcel Dell Vecchio; October 8, 1919 – July 3, 1988) was an American actor and one of the members of what came to be known as the Dead End Kids, then later the East Side Kids and finally The Bowery Boys.

Acting career
Born in New York City, Dell almost made his stage debut a few years before Dead End when he and his sister were slated for roles in The Good Earth with Alla Nazimova and Claude Rains. Dell served in the United States Merchant Marine during World War II. He appeared in numerous films as a Dead End Kid/East Side Kid/Bowery Boy. In the 1944 East Side Kids film Million Dollar Kid, Dell appeared as a criminal villain, pitted against the boys, who gets brought to justice in the end.

Dell's most prominent stage role was in the play The Sign in Sidney Brustein's Window, written by Lorraine Hansberry. The production opened on Broadway at the Longacre Theatre on October 15, 1964, and was directed by Peter Kass. Jack Blackman designed scenery, Jules Fisher designed lighting, and Fred Voelpel designed costumes. The original cast featured Dell as Sidney Brustein and Rita Moreno as Iris Parodus Brustein. The play received mixed reviews and closed on January 10, 1965.

His other non-Dead End Kids/Bowery Boys films included The 300 Year Weekend (1971), Who Is Harry Kellerman and Why Is He Saying Those Terrible Things About Me?  (1971), Earthquake (1974), and Framed (1975). He also appeared in The Manchu Eagle Murder Caper Mystery (1975), and The Escape Artist (1982). Dell also made several appearances on television shows during the 1960s and 1970s. including Ben Casey, The Fugitive, Mannix, Then Came Bronson, I Dream of Jeannie, McCloud, Sanford and Son, and Barney Miller. 

According to differing sources, either Don Francks, Charles Bronson, or Dell was the uncredited actor providing the voice of Boba Fett, a Mandalorian bounty hunter, in the Star Wars Holiday Special.

Death
Dell died in North Hollywood of leukemia in 1988 at age 68.

Film

Dead End (1937) - T.B.
Crime School (1938) - Bugs
Little Tough Guy (1938) - String
Angels with Dirty Faces (1938) - Pasty
They Made Me a Criminal (1939) - T.B.
Hell's Kitchen (1939) - Ace
The Angels Wash Their Faces (1939) - Luigi
On Dress Parade (1939) - Cadet Georgie Warren
The Right Way (1939, short) - Tom Martin 
You're Not So Tough (1940) - String
Junior G-Men (1940, Serial) - Terry
Give Us Wings (1940) - String
Hit the Road (1941) - String
Mob Town (1941) - String
Sea Raiders (1941, Serial) - Bilge
Mr. Wise Guy (1942) - Charlie Manning
Junior G-Men of the Air (1942, Serial) - 'Stick' Munsey
Let's Get Tough! (1942) - Fritz Heinbach
Tough As They Come (1942) - String
Smart Alecks (1942) - Hank
'Neath Brooklyn Bridge (1942) - Skid
Mug Town (1942) - String
Kid Dynamite (1943) - Harry Wycoff
Keep 'Em Slugging (1943) - String
Mr. Muggs Steps Out (1943) - Dips Nolan
Million Dollar Kid (1944) - Lefty
Follow the Leader (1944) - W.W. 'Fingers' Belmont
Block Busters (1944) - Skinny
Bowery Champs (1944) - Jim Lindsay
Come Out Fighting (1945) - Pete
Spook Busters (1946) - Gabe 'Gabie' Moreno
Mr. Hex (1946) - Gabe Moreno
Hard Boiled Mahoney (1947) - Gabe 'Gabie'
News Hounds (1947) - Gabe
Bowery Buckaroos (1947) - Gabe, aka The Klondike Kid
Angels' Alley (1948) - Ricky Moreno
Jinx Money (1948) - Gabe
Smugglers' Cove (1948) - Gabe Moreno
Trouble Makers (1948) - Police Officer Gabe Moreno
Fighting Fools (1949) - Gabe Moreno
Hold That Baby! (1949) - Gabe 'Gabie' Moreno
Angels in Disguise (1949) - Gabe Moreno
Master Minds (1949) - Gabe Moreno
Blonde Dynamite (1950) - Gabe Moreno
Lucky Losers (1950) - Gabe Moreno, TV Reporter
Triple Trouble (1950) - Gabriel 'Gabe' Moreno
Blues Busters (1950) - Gabe Moreno
Katie Did It (1951) - Eddie (uncredited)
Escape from Terror (1955) - Col. Tovchenko
When the Girls Take Over (1962) - Henderson
The 300 Year Weekend (1971) - Wynter
Who Is Harry Kellerman and Why Is He Saying Those Terrible Things About Me? (1971) - Sidney Gill
Earthquake (1974) - Sal
The Manchu Eagle Murder Caper Mystery (1975) - Malcolm
Framed (1975) - Vince Greeson
The Escape Artist (1982) - Uncle Burke

Television

See also

References

External links
 
 
 

1919 births
1988 deaths
20th-century American male actors
American male child actors
American male stage actors
American people of Italian descent
American male television actors
Deaths from cancer in California
Deaths from leukemia